Rhodomelaceae